This is a list of years in the Kingdom of Great Britain and United Kingdom from the Acts of Union 1707. See also timeline of British history. For only articles about years in the United Kingdom that have been written, see :Category:Years in the United Kingdom.

21st century

20th century

19th century

18th century

See also
 List of years in England
 List of years in Northern Ireland
 List of years in Scotland
 List of years in Wales
 Lists of British films
 List of years in British television

 
United Kingdom history-related lists
United Kingdom